Bob Keenan (born March 11, 1952) is a Republican member of the Montana Legislature. He was elected on November 4, 2014, to Senate District 5, and assumed that office on January 5, 2015, serving in the 2015 legislative session. Keenan represents District 19, which encompasses parts of Flathead and Lake Counties, Montana. Keenan served as President pro tempore from 2017-2018, and as the Senate Minority Leader from 2005–2007.
Keenan previously served in the Montana House of Representatives from 1995 to 1999 and in the Montana Senate from 1999 to 2007, where he was president of the senate.

References

|-

1952 births
21st-century American politicians
Living people
Republican Party Montana state senators
People from Bigfork, Montana
Presidents of the Montana Senate